Courtois Township is an inactive township in Crawford County, in the U.S. state of Missouri.

Courtois Township takes its name from Courtois Creek and is located in the Courtois Hills region of the Ozarks.

References

Townships in Missouri
Townships in Crawford County, Missouri